Agrahara Valagerehalli  is a village in the southern state of Karnataka, India. It is located in the Channapatna taluk of Bangalore Rural district in Karnataka.

See also
 Bangalore Rural
 Districts of Karnataka

References

Villages in Bangalore Rural district